The 2008 mid-year rugby union tests (also known as the Summer Internationals in the Northern Hemisphere) refers to the international rugby union played from May to July 2008; they were mostly in the Southern Hemisphere.  For Australia, New Zealand and South Africa they were preparation for the 2008 Tri-Nations. The Barbarians, an invitational club side, also conducted a three-match tour.

Overview

Series

Other tours

Barbarians matches

International matches

See also
Mid-year rugby union test series
2008 end-of-year rugby union tests
2008 Asian Five Nations
2008 IRB Churchill Cup
2008 IRB Pacific Nations Cup
2008 IRB Nations Cup

References

External links

2008
2008–09 in European rugby union
2007–08 in European rugby union
2008 in Oceanian rugby union
2008 in South American rugby union
2008 in South African rugby union